Tate Glacier is a tributary glacier on the south side of Thomas Spur, flowing east and merging with Moffett Glacier just east of the spur where the two glaciers enter the larger Amundsen Glacier, in the Queen Maud Mountains. Mapped by United States Geological Survey (USGS) from surveys and U.S. Navy air photos, 1960–64. Named by Advisory Committee on Antarctic Names (US-ACAN) for Robert Tate, geomagnetist-seismologist with the South Pole Station winter party, 1964.

Glaciers of Amundsen Coast